Carl Fitzgerald is a professional Canadian Football fullback who is currently a free agent. He was drafted by the Winnipeg Blue Bombersin the third round of the 2013 CFL Draft.

At the conclusion of the 2015 CFL season, Fitzgerald was re-signed for 2016 by the Saskatchewan Roughriders.

References

External links 
Winnipeg Blue Bombers bio

Canadian football fullbacks
1990 births
Living people
Saskatchewan Roughriders players
Winnipeg Blue Bombers players